This page provides information of the qualification for the 1994 AFC U-17 Championship.

Groups

Group 1
The group consisted of Jordan, Oman, and Pakistan, with matches played in Amman, Jordan.

Oman qualified for the final tournament.

Group 2
The group consisted of United Arab Emirates, Saudi Arabia, Syria and Yemen, with matches played in Damascus, Syria.

United Arab Emirates, Saudi Arabia qualified for the final tournament.

Group 3
The group consisted of Kazakhstan, Kyrgyzstan, Tajikistan and Uzbekistan, with matches played in Almaty, Kazakhstan.

Uzbekistan qualified for the final tournament.

Group 4
The group consisted of Bahrain, India, Kuwait, with matches played in Tehran, Iran.

Bahrain qualified for the final tournament.

Group 5

Group 6
The group consisted of Guam, Japan, South Korea, with matches played in Seoul, South Korea.

Japan and South Korea qualified for the final tournament.

External links
RSSSF

AFC U-16 Championship qualification
1994 AFC U-16 Championship